Farbenspiel is the sixth studio album by German singer Helene Fischer. It was released on 4 October 2013 by Polydor.

With over 2.7 million copies sold worldwide, Farbenspiel is one of the best-selling German albums of all time. Farbenspiel  won the Echo Music Prize for Album of the Year in 2014 and 2015.

Track listing

Charts

Weekly charts

Year-end charts

Decade-end charts

Certifications and sales

References

External links
 Helene-Fischer.de — official site

2013 albums